Bikhre Moti is a 1971 Indian Hindi-language drama film, produced by Omi Arora under the Gita Shree Films banner and directed by Tapi Chanakya. It stars Jeetendra and Babita, and the music was composed by Laxmikant–Pyarelal.

Plot
Sulochana is a young mother who accepts forced widowhood and has to leave her home with her two sons. She gets involved in an accident while saving the life of a millionaires only daughter Leela and ends up losing her two sons. The millionaire, by his will, names Sulochana as the guardian of Leela before his death. Fate ordains her sons Anand and Gopi to grow up in totally different environments. Anand gets rescued by Inspector Ram Prakash and grows up to be a police officer, while Gopi grows up to be a notorious criminal. Unaware of their relationship, Gopi and Anand become arch enemies when they both fall in love with Leela. On the wedding day of Anand and Leela, Ramprakash is killed chasing criminals Gopi and Jeevan a murderer released from jail. On hearing the news Leela loses her senses in a state shock of losing another father in an accident. Anand vows to remain unmarried till he arrests the criminals who killed Ramprakash and soon discovers that Gopi is the murderer. Sulochana also learns the truth about Gopi, but realizes that he is her long lost son after seeing a childhood mark. Leela also regains her senses after falling from the stairs. Gopi sets out to end Anand and takes the help of Jeevan who is their father. He doesn't kill Anand on realising that he is his own son. Fate pits the two brothers against each other but both parents reunite the brothers.

Cast

 Jeetendra as Anand
 Babita as Leela
 Nazir Hussain as Ram Prakash
 Tarun Bose as Jeevan
 Asit Sen as Munimji
 Sujit Kumar as Gopi
 Murad as Doctor
 C.S. Dubey as Gopi's mentor
 Shabnam as Susheela
 Hari Sbivdasani as CBI officer
 Yusuf Khan
 Helen as Dancer
 Kamini Kaushal as Sulochana
 Irshad Panjatan as Raju
 Roma as Gopis secretary

Soundtrack

External links

1970s Hindi-language films
1971 films
Films scored by Laxmikant–Pyarelal
Films directed by Tapi Chanakya